The San Rafael Valley is a high intermontane grass valley in eastern Santa Cruz County, Arizona. The valley is bounded to the west by the Patagonia Mountains, to the north and northeast by the Canelo Hills and to the east by the Huachuca Mountains in Cochise County. The valley forms the headwaters of the Santa Cruz River which flows south into Sonora, Mexico just east of the historic Lochiel townsite.

The San Rafael de la Zanja Land Grant lies in the valley center just north of Lochiel. The Nature Conservancy purchased the former land grant ranch in 1998 and Arizona established the "San Rafael State Natural Area" in the valley in 1999 on the southern part of that property.  The protected areas are not open to the public. The land grant is privately owned.  The State Natural Area is south of the land grant, and borders Mexico.  In 2008, the San Rafael Ranch headquarters was added to the National Register of Historic Places as the "San Rafael Ranch Historic District".

See also

 Cienega Valley (Arizona)
 Sulphur Springs Valley

References

 San Rafael State Natural Area – Arizona

Landforms of Santa Cruz County, Arizona
Valleys of Arizona
Chihuahuan Desert